The Calumet River is a system of heavily industrialized rivers and canals in the region between the south side of Chicago, Illinois, and the city of Gary, Indiana. Historically, the Little Calumet River and the Grand Calumet River were one, the former flowing west from Indiana into Illinois, then turning back east to its mouth at Lake Michigan at Marquette Park in Gary.

Background
The name "Calumet" is from the French colonial name for a particular type of Native American ceremonial pipe that served as a universal sign of peace among the Illiniwek, and which was presented to Pere Marquette in 1673.

Before human alteration, water flowed westward from LaPorte County, Indiana, along the Little Calumet River, made a hairpin turn at Blue Island, and flowed east along the Grand Calumet into Lake Michigan at the Miller Beach community of Gary, Indiana. The area is extremely flat and the course and even the direction of the river system has changed repeatedly. The low gradient gives the river only a very small current.

Industrial development in the Calumet River area began around the 1870s, and by 1890 the western reach of the Grand Calumet River was heavily polluted with the waste of steel mills, foundries, a meat packing plant, and glue and cornstarch factories. Industry continued to spread along the eastern reach of the river between 1890 and 1910, with similar results.  These decades of unrestricted pollution have left the river sediments highly contaminated to this day.

In September 2008, areas of Lake and Porter County, Indiana, were declared national disaster areas. The Little Calumet River breached its levee and flooded portions of the towns of Munster and Highland, Indiana. In September 2019, Luxembourg-based ArcelorMittal notified Indiana officials of a toxic spill from its Burns Harbor steel mill had spilled into a branch of the Little Calumet River, resulting in short-term closures of three Lake Michigan beaches.

Segments of the Calumet River system

Calumet River
The Calumet River, on the south side of Chicago, originally simply drained Lake Calumet to Lake Michigan. A canal extending it, legendarily claimed to have been created by voyageurs at the site of a frequent portage, was dug connecting the two Calumet Rivers at the point where the name now changes from Grand to Little.

The T.J. O'Brien Lock and Dam was installed across the river in 1960 to control the movement of water between Lake Michigan and the river.

Grand Calumet River

The Grand Calumet River, originating in Miller Beach, flows  through the cities of Gary, East Chicago and Hammond, as well as Calumet City and Burnham on the Illinois side. Today, a large portion of the river's flow originates as municipal and industrial effluent, cooling and process water and storm water overflows. Although discharges have been reduced, a number of contaminants continue to impair the area.

Little Calumet River

The Little Calumet River originally flowed in New Durham Township, LaPorte County, Indiana, to its junction with the Grand Calumet and Calumet rivers, but construction of the Burns Waterway in 1926 effectively cut the Little Calumet River into a west and an east arm. The west arm is now known as the Little Calumet River proper, and it flows through or borders the towns of Portage, Lake Station, Gary, Highland, Griffith, Munster, and Hammond, then through  South Holland, Dolton, Lansing, Calumet City, Harvey, Riverdale, Phoenix, Dixmoor, Burnham, and Blue Island in Illinois, connecting at the junction of the Grand Calumet River and Calumet River. Its flow has been divided by the Burns Waterway since 1926 with the portion east of Hart Ditch in Munster flowing east to the Burns Waterway and out to Lake Michigan, and the portion west of Hart Ditch in Munster flowing west to the Calumet River and Cal-Sag Channel. The Little Calumet has  of river and tributaries and drains . The major tributaries are Deep River and its Turkey Creek sub-tributary, and the Salt Creek tributary of the East Arm Little Calumet River.

The East Arm Little Calumet River, also known as the Little Calumet River East Branch begins just east of Holmesville in New Durham Township, LaPorte County, Indiana, and also flows through Chesterton, Porter, and Burns Harbor where it connects to the Port of Indiana-Burns Waterway. It used to continue westward to Illinois as the Little Calumet River, but construction of the Burns Waterway in 1926 diverted its flow into Lake Michigan.

Until sometime in the late 1940s or early 1950s, the Little Calumet River was heavily polluted with sewage, and the only fish living in the river were carp. During heavy spring rains, the river would often flood areas adjacent to the river.

The Little Calumet River has been undergoing construction of a $200 million flood control and recreation project by the Chicago District of the U.S. Army Corps of Engineers since 1990. The project was expected to be complete in 2013. Additionally, seven miles (11 km) of the river channel is being relocated to allow better water flow, and highway bridges are being modified to permit unobstructed flow of water. A flood warning system is also being implemented. When complete, the project will protect over 9,500 homes and businesses in the towns of Gary, Griffith, Highland, Hammond, and Munster in Indiana, and prevent nearly $11 million in flood damage annually. On September 15, 2008, the remnants of Hurricane Ike released heavy rain which flooded the banks of the Little Calumet River. Houses and strip malls in northern Munster and southern Hammond were evacuated. Hundreds of homes were damaged due to flooding. Recently, a new levee, along Northcote Avenue in Munster, is being built to protect residents from future floods.

Cal-Sag Channel

The Cal-Sag Channel (short for "Calumet-Saganashkee Channel") is a navigation canal in southern Cook County, Illinois. It serves as a channel between the Little Calumet River and the Chicago Sanitary and Ship Canal. It is 16 miles (26 km) long and was dug over an 11-year period, from 1911 until 1922.

The Cal-Sag Channel serves barge traffic in what was an active zone of heavy industry in the far southern neighborhoods of the city of Chicago and adjacent suburbs. As of 2006 it was also used more as a conduit for wastewater from southern Cook County, including the Chicago-area Deep Tunnel Project, into the Illinois Waterway. It is also used by pleasure crafts in the summer time.

The western 4.5 miles (7.3 km) of the channel flow through the Palos Forest Preserve, a large area of parkland operated by the Forest Preserve District of Cook County.

The Cal-Sag Channel served as the rowing venue for the 1959 Pan American Games.

When it is completed, the Calumet-Sag Trail, a 26-miles-long (41 km) greenway, will border the channel and will stretch from the Chicago Sanitary and Ship Canal to the Burnham Greenway.

See also
Indiana Harbor and Ship Canal
Lake Calumet
List of Illinois rivers
List of Indiana rivers

References

External links

US EPA Area of Concern
Prairie Rivers Network
TopoQuest, Cal Sag and Little Calumet
Encyclopedia of Chicago – Calumet River System

Rivers of Indiana
Transportation in Gary, Indiana
Rivers of Illinois
Canals in Indiana
Canals in Illinois
Pollution in the United States
Tributaries of Lake Michigan
Geography of Chicago
Rivers of Lake County, Indiana
Transportation buildings and structures in Lake County, Indiana